Pipar city is a town and a municipality in Jodhpur district in the Indian state of Rajasthan. Jojari River, the tributary of Luni River passes through this town.

Legend
Pipar was founded by a Paliwal Brahmin called Pipa. Pipa was in the habit of carrying milk to deity of the serpent race ( the Takshakas or Nagas ) whose retreat was on the banks of a lake, and who deposited two pieces of gold in return for the Paliwal's offering. Being compelled to go to Nagaur, the latter instructed his son to perform his charitable office, but the youth thought of becoming the master of the treasure himself and when the serpent issued forth for its accumstomed fare, he struck it violently with a stick. The snake, however, being scotched, not killed, retired to its hole. The young Brahmin narrated the event to his mother who dreading the vengeance of the deity arranged to send him away the next day to his father. However, when she sent to call the boy in morning she was horrified to find, instead of him, the huge serpent coiled upon his bed. Pipa, on his return, was inconsolable. But he continued his libations of milk which at length appeased the monster who showed him where the gold was stored and commanded him to raise a monument which would transmit a knowledge of the event to future ages. Hence arose Pipar from Pipa the Paliwal, while the lake was named Sampu after the serpent. This Sampu or Sampa sarowar (tank) still exists on the outskirts of the town.

Demographics
 Piparcity had a population of 36,810. Males constitute 52% of the population and females 48%. Piparcity has an average literacy rate of 52%, lower than the national average of 59.5%: male literacy is 66%, and female literacy is 36%. In Piparcity, 18% of the population is under 6 years of age.

Education
It has a government women's college, Smt. Sita Dewi Chunni Lal Bardiya Mahila Mahavidyalay and three senior secondary level government schools along with other private colleges and schools.

Tourist attractions

Shri Mahaldhani Dadosa baoji Temple 

The local historical tale has it that "Shri Dadosa baoji", who used to rule the area, sacrificed his life in a battle with enemies. His head fell near the "Kot". But he still kept fighting, and his body fell almost a kilometer away after killing many more enemy soldiers. There are two temples devoted to him. First, the main temple, inside the "Kot", where his head fell, and the second, the smaller temple near the "Sapasar talav" (a pond), where his body fell.

References

Cities and towns in Jodhpur district